Rae Lakes is a series of lakes in the Sierra Nevada, located in Kings Canyon National Park, eastern Fresno County, California. The lakes are located on the John Muir Trail at the base of Black Mountain.

See also 
 List of lakes in California

References 

Lakes of Fresno County, California
Kings Canyon National Park
Lakes of California
Lakes of Northern California